Cumbres Institute (in Spanish: Instituto Cumbres) is a series of prestigious Catholic and bilingual schools. 
The first Cumbres Institute was founded in Mexico City, Mexico, by the Legionaries of Christ in 1954 in the neighborhood of Lomas de Chapultepec.. 
Many years later, there were many campuses extending all over Mexico and other Latin Americain countries such as Brazil, Chile, Spain, and Venezuela. The first Cumbres campus was founded in Lomas de Chapultepec in 1954 with the name of “Instituto Cumbres de Lomas”.
In recent years, the Cumbres Institute has been involved in controversy.  Particularly noteworthy is the fight that occurred in June 2017 between students of the school against students of the Irish Institute of Mexico City  Due to these and other incidents, Instituto Cumbres decided to change its name to Prepa Anahuac, associating itself with Universidad Anahuac.
In recent years, the Cumbres Institute has been involved in controversy.  Particularly noteworthy is the fight that occurred in June 2017 between students of the school against students of the Irish Institute of Mexico City  Due to these and other incidents, Instituto Cumbres decided to change its name to Prepa Anahuac, associating itself with Universidad Anahuac.
In recent years, the Cumbres Institute has been involved in controversy.  Particularly noteworthy is the fight that occurred in June 2017 between students of the school against students of the Irish Institute of Mexico City  Due to these and other incidents, Instituto Cumbres decided to change its name to Prepa Anahuac, associating itself with Universidad Anahuac.

Schools
 Instituto Cumbres Lomas 

 Instituto Cumbres De Caracas 

 Instituto Cumbres Mėxico (with Instituto Rosedal Vista Hermosa)
 Instituto Cumbres Bosques
 Instituto Cumbres y Godwin Mėrida 
 Instituto Cumbres San Javier (with Instituto Alpes San Javier)
 Instituto Cumbres y Alpes Querėtaro

References

External links
Anahuac University
Cumbres Institute Campus Bosques

Catholic schools in Mexico
Regnum Christi
Legion of Christ